Sirajul Haque is an Indian politician. In 1978 he was elected as MLA of Sarukhetri Vidhan Sabha Constituency in Assam Legislative Assembly.

References 

Assam MLAs 1978–1983
Independent politicians in India
Year of birth missing